Charles Morton Webb (December 30, 1833 – August 12, 1911) was an American lawyer, judge, and politician. He was a Wisconsin Circuit Court Judge for 28 years, United States Attorney for the Western District of Wisconsin, and a member of the Wisconsin State Senate.

Biography
Charles Morton Webb was born on December 30, 1833, in Towanda, Pennsylvania, the youngest of five children born to John L. Webb and Annis (Hammond) Webb. Webb received a basic education there, but left school at age 12 to work as a typesetter in a printing office.  He attended the United States Military Academy for one year, in 1850, but then moved to Washington, D.C., to work for three years in the Government Publishing Office, where he was exposed to many of the debates taking place in the pre-Civil War capitol.  He was inspired to a career in law and returned home to study with the leading lawyer in his home city.  He was admitted to the bar in 1857 and that same year he married Jane Pierce.

His brothers, William and Henry had earlier traveled west to Wisconsin, and, in 1857, Charles Webb and his wife followed.  In 1858, Charles worked as a clerk for the Wisconsin State Assembly while his brother William was a member.  He moved to Grand Rapids, Wisconsin, in April 1858, where he would reside until his death. He was elected District Attorney of Wood County, Wisconsin, in 1858 and was re-elected in 1860, but resigned in 1861 to volunteer for service in the American Civil War.

Webb has commissioned a 1st Lieutenant for Company G in the 12th Wisconsin Volunteer Infantry Regiment as it was organized in Madison, Wisconsin.  They mustered into service in October 1961 and marched out in December en route to Fort Leavenworth, Kansas.  They were attached to the Department of Kansas, operating in the Trans-Mississippi Theater of the American Civil War.  The regiment patrolled and garrisoned in the Leavenworth area through the spring of 1862.  In May 1862, after serving eight months, Webb resigned his commission and returned to Wisconsin.

Back in Wood County, he was elected Clerk of the County Board of Supervisors in 1864, and was re-elected in 1866.  In 1868, he was elected to the Wisconsin State Senate as a Republican, serving in the 1869 and 1870 sessions.  In the summer of 1870, after the end of the legislative session—which ran from January 12 through March 17—Webb was appointed United States Attorney for the Western District of Wisconsin by President Ulysses S. Grant.  He was re-appointed in 1874 and continued in office until 1878.  In 1880, he was elected Mayor of Grand Rapids, Wisconsin, and was re-elected in 1881.  In the fall of 1881, he was appointed register of the U.S. Land Office in Deadwood, Dakota Territory, but resigned the following summer to return to Wisconsin.

He was elected to another term in the State Senate in 1882, but he would again leave before the end of his term in late 1883, when he was appointed to the Wisconsin Circuit Court by Governor Jeremiah McLain Rusk.  Webb would remain Judge of the 7th Circuit for the remaining 28 years of his life, winning re-election five times, in 1884, 1890, 1896, 1902, and 1908.  However, he would attempt several times to seek higher office: In 1893, he ran for election to the Wisconsin Supreme Court, but was defeated by Alfred Newman; in 1894, he unsuccessfully sought the Republican nomination for Governor against William H. Upham.  Webb was, after the 1894 election, offered an appointment to the Wisconsin Supreme Court by Governor Upham, but he declined.

Webb died on August 12, 1911.

Electoral history

Wisconsin Supreme Court (1893)

| colspan="6" style="text-align:center;background-color: #e9e9e9;"| General Election, April 7, 1893

References

People from Towanda, Pennsylvania
People from Waushara County, Wisconsin
People from Wisconsin Rapids, Wisconsin
United States Military Academy alumni
County officials in Wisconsin
Wisconsin state court judges
Wisconsin state senators
Wisconsin lawyers
People of Wisconsin in the American Civil War
Union Army officers
1833 births
1911 deaths
19th-century American judges
19th-century American lawyers
Military personnel from Pennsylvania